Physalaemus is a large genus of leptodactylid frogs. These frogs, sometimes known as dwarf frogs or foam frogs, are found in South America. It is very similar to Leptodactylus, a close relative, and indeed the recently described Leptodactylus lauramiriamae is in some aspects intermediate between them.

Species
There are 50 or 49 species (AmphibiaWeb lists Physalaemus nattereri as Eupemphix nattereri ):

References

 
Leptodactylidae
Amphibians of South America
Taxa named by Leopold Fitzinger
Amphibian genera